Aleocharina is the type subtribe and largest subtribe of the tribe Aleocharini. It contains 450 species in 10 genera. Although the average number of species per genera is 45, one genus (Aleochara) contains nearly all species of the subtribe. The classification of the subtribe is under debate due to the uncertainties of the genus Aleochara. Members of the subtribe are characterized by a 5-5-5 segmented tarsi.

The subtribe contains the following genera:

Aleochara 
Correa
Cratoacrochara
Creochara
Ilarochara 
Leptogenophilus
Lyperosterochara
Ocyota
Oxybessoglossa
Palaeochara
Paraleochara 
Paroxysmeme
Piochardia 
Plesiochara
Pseudocalea

References

Aleocharinae
Insect subtribes